The Roman Catholic Diocese of Huancavelica is a diocese located in the city of Huancavélica in the Ecclesiastical province of Ayacucho in Peru.

History
On 18 December 1944 Pope Pius XII established as Diocese of Huancavelica from the Diocese of Ayacucho.

Bishops

Ordinaries
Alberto Maria Dettmann y Aragón, O.P. (6 July 1945 – 28 June 1948), appointed Bishop of Puno 
Carlos Maria Jurgens Byrne, C.Ss.R. (13 January 1949 – 7 February 1954), appointed Bishop of Peru, Military
Florencio Coronado Romani, C.Ss.R. (1 March 1956 – 14 January 1982)
William Dermott Molloy McDermott (14 January 1982 – 18 June 2005)
Isidro Barrio Barrio (18 June 2005 – 21 May 2021)
Carlos Alberto Salcedo Ojeda, O.M.I. (21 May 2021 – present)

Coadjutor bishop
Isidro Barrio Barrio (2002-2005)

Auxiliary bishop
William Dermott Molloy McDermott (1976–1982), appointed Bishop here

See also
Roman Catholicism in Peru

Sources
 GCatholic.org
 Catholic Hierarchy

Roman Catholic dioceses in Peru
Roman Catholic Ecclesiastical Province of Ayacucho
Christian organizations established in 1944
Roman Catholic dioceses and prelatures established in the 20th century